Chaetonychia is a genus of flowering plants belonging to the family Caryophyllaceae. It is monotypic, being represented by the single species Chaetonychia cymosa.
Its native range is the western Mediterranean.

References

Caryophyllaceae
Monotypic Caryophyllaceae genera